The 1869 Wallace by-elections were two by-elections held in the  electorate in Southland, following two resignations during the 4th New Zealand Parliament

Alexander McNeil resigned and was replaced on 30 April by Cuthbert Cowan, who was unopposed. McNeil supported the Stafford Ministry, Cowan did not.
Cuthbert Cowan resigned and was replaced on 17 September by George Webster. Webster won by six votes over his opponent James Clark Brown, who had been associated with the Gold Fields (though not as an MP) and was a resident of Lawrence.

Results

References 

Wallace 1869
1869 elections in New Zealand
Politics of Southland, New Zealand
April 1860 events
September 1860 events